Don McBride Stadium is a baseball ballpark built in 1936 at the corner of Northwest 13th Street and Peacock Road in Richmond, Indiana. It is named after Joseph Donald McBride, the former director of the Richmond Parks Department who oversaw development of the stadium.

The ballpark has hosted four minor-league baseball teams over the years: the Richmond Roses (1946-48), the Richmond Robins (1949), the Richmond Tigers (1950-52) and the Richmond Roosters (1995-2005), as well as the Richmond High School, Seton Catholic Cardinals and Earlham College teams. It was home to the Richmond RiverRats of the collegiate summer Prospect League from 2009 to 2015. It is currently home to the Richmond Jazz of the Great Lakes Summer Collegiate League.

The stadium features a small covered grandstand. Seating capacity is 1,787. It was renovated in 1995.

Notes

External links
Ballpark Reviews: Don McBride Stadium

Baseball venues in Indiana
Buildings and structures in Richmond, Indiana
1936 establishments in Indiana
Sports venues completed in 1936
College baseball venues in the United States
High school baseball venues in the United States
Sports in Richmond, Indiana